The 1968 Australian Championships was a tennis tournament that took place in the outdoor Kooyong Stadium in Melbourne, Australia from 19 to 29 January. It was the 56th edition of the Australian Championships (now known as Australian Open), the 16th held in Melbourne, and the first Grand Slam tournament of the year. It was also the last Grand Slam tournament to be restricted to amateurs. The singles titles were won by Australian William Bowrey and American Billie Jean King.

Seniors

Men's singles

 William Bowrey defeated  Juan Gisbert Sr. 7–5, 2–6, 9–7, 6–4 
It was Bowrey's only Grand Slam title.

Women's singles

 Billie Jean King defeated  Margaret Court 6–1, 6–2 
It was King's 13th Grand Slam title.

Men's doubles

 Dick Crealy /  Allan Stone defeated  Terry Addison /  Ray Keldie 10–8, 6–4, 6–3 
It was Crealy's 1st Grand Slam title. It was Stone's 1st Grand Slam title.

Women's doubles

 Karen Krantzcke /  Kerry Melville defeated  Judy Tegart /  Lesley Turner 6–4, 3–6, 6–2 
It was Krantzcke's only Grand Slam title. It was Melville's 1st Grand Slam title.

Mixed doubles

 Dick Crealy /  Billie Jean King defeated  Allan Stone /  Margaret Court by walkover
It was Crealy's 2nd Grand Slam title. It was King's 14th Grand Slam title.

Juniors

Boys' singles
 Phil Dent

Girls' singles
 Lesley Hunt

References

External links
 Australian Open official website

 
Championships
1968
January 1968 sports events in Australia
1968,Australian Championships
Sports competitions in Melbourne
Tennis in Victoria (Australia)